Loretto Heights may refer to:

The heights of Notre Dame de Lorette in France
Teikyo Loretto Heights University